Nuno Filipe Correia de Sousa (born 18 April 1993 in Oliveira de Azeméis) is a Portuguese footballer who plays for U.D. Oliveirense as a midfielder.

Football career
On 18 May 2013, Sousa made his professional debut with Oliveirense in a 2012–13 Segunda Liga match against Vitória Guimarães B, when he replaced Renan (87th minute).

References

External links

Stats and profile at LPFP 

1993 births
Living people
Portuguese footballers
Association football midfielders
Liga Portugal 2 players
U.D. Oliveirense players